Too Young is the fourth studio album by American singer Donny Osmond, released in 1972. It reached number 11 on the Billboard Top LPs chart on September 23, 1972.  The singles, "Too Young" and "Why", both reached No. 13 on the Billboard Hot 100.  It was certified Gold by the RIAA on January 24, 1973.

Track listing

Charts

Certifications

References

1972 albums
Donny Osmond albums
Albums produced by Michael Lloyd (music producer)
MGM Records albums